Lucius Cossinius was a Roman praetor who aided Publius Varinius against Spartacus during the Third Servile War. He was aided by his tribune Lucius Furius and the quaestor Gaius Toranius.

Film Portrayals
Cossinius was portrayed by John Wraight in the Starz original series Spartacus: War of the Damned.

References 

1st-century BC Romans
Third Servile War